C to HDL tools convert C language or C-like computer code into a hardware description language (HDL) such as VHDL or Verilog.  The converted code can then be synthesized and translated into a hardware device such as a field-programmable gate array.  Compared to software, equivalent designs in hardware consume less power (yielding higher performance per watt) and execute faster with lower latency, more parallelism and higher throughput.  However, system design and functional verification in a hardware description language can be tedious and time-consuming, so systems engineers often write critical modules in HDL and other modules in a high-level language and synthesize these into HDL through C to HDL or high-level synthesis tools.

RTL refers to the register transfer level representation of a program necessary to implement it in logic.

History
Early development on C to HDL was done by Ian Page, Charles Sweeney and colleagues at Oxford University in the 1990s who developed the Handel-C language.  They commercialized their research by forming Embedded Solutions Limited (ESL) in 1999 which was renamed Celoxica in September 2000.  In 2008, the embedded systems departments of Celoxica was sold to Catalytic for $3 million and which later merged to become Agility Computing.  In January 2009, Mentor Graphics acquired Agility's C synthesis assets.  Celoxica continues to trade concentrating on hardware acceleration in the financial and other industries.

Applications 
C to HDL techniques are most commonly applied to applications that have unacceptably high execution times on existing general-purpose supercomputer architectures.  Examples include bioinformatics, computational fluid dynamics (CFD), financial processing, and oil and gas survey data analysis.  Embedded applications requiring high performance or real-time data processing are also an area of use.  System-on-chip (SoC) design may also take advantage of C to HDL techniques.

C-to-VHDL compilers are very useful for large designs or for implementing code that might change in the future.  Designing a large application entirely in HDL may be very difficult and time-consuming; the abstraction of a high level language for such a large application will often reduce total development time.  Furthermore, an application coded in HDL will almost certainly be more difficult to modify than one coded in a higher level language.  If the designer needs to add new functionality to the application, adding a few lines of C code will almost always be easier than remodeling the equivalent HDL code.

Flow to HDL tools have a similar aim, but with flow rather than C-based design.

Example tools 
LegUp Open Source ANSI C to Verilog tool, based on LLVM compiler.
LegUp Commercial variant of LegUp.
VHDP Simplified VHDL with support of procedural programming.
bambu (free and open source ANSI C to Verilog tool based on GCC compiler) from PandA website
CBG CtoV A tool developed 1995-99 by DJ Greaves (Univ Cambridge) that instantiated RAMs and interpreted various SystemC constructs and datatypes.
C-to-Verilog tool (NISC) from University of California, Irvine
Altium Designer 6.9 and 7.0 (a.k.a. Summer 08) from Altium
Nios II C-to-Hardware Acceleration Compiler from Altera
Catapult C tool from  Mentor Graphics
Cynthesizer from Forte Design Systems
SystemC from Celoxica (defunct)
Handel-C from Celoxica (defunct)
DIME-C from Nallatech
Impulse C from Impulse Accelerated Technologies
FpgaC which is an open source initiative
SA-C programming language
 Cascade (C to RTL synthesizer) from CriticalBlue
Mitrion-C from Mitrionics
C2R Compiler from Cebatech
PICO Express from Synfora
SPARK (a C-to-VHDL) from University Of California, San Diego
Hardware Compile Environment (HCE) from Accelize (formerly HARWEST Compiling Environment from Ylichron)
HercuLeS (C/assembly-to-VHDL) tool 
VLSI/VHDL CAD Group Index of Useful Tools from CWRU University homepage
DWARV as part of the research project ′Delft Work Bench′ and used in the ′hArtes tool chain′
MyHDL is a Python-subset compiler and simulator to VHDL and Verilog
Trident (C to VHDL) from trident.sourceforge.net
Vsyn (C to Verilog, Russian project)
 Instant SoC by FPGA Cores generates a SoC with RISC-V core, peripherals and memories directly from C++.
 PipelineC C-like hardware description language adding High-level synthesis-like automatic pipelining as a language construct/compiler feature.

See also 
 Comparison of EDA Software
 Electronic design automation (EDA)
 High-level synthesis
 Silicon compiler
Hardware acceleration

References

External links 
A good article on Dr Dobbs Journal about ImpulseC.
An overview of flows by Daresbury Labs.
An Overview of Hardware Compilation and the Handel-C language.
Xilinx's ESL initiative, some products listed and C to VHDL tools.
Altium's C-to-Hardware Compiler overview.
Altera's Nios II C2H Acceleration Compiler White Paper.

Hardware description languages
Program transformation
Hardware acceleration